Gerga or Gergas (Γεργας), also possibly called Leukai Stelai was a town of ancient Caria. 

Its site is located near Ovacık in Asiatic Turkey.

References

Populated places in ancient Caria
Former populated places in Turkey
Roman towns and cities in Turkey
History of Aydın Province
Çine District